Diego Ignacio López (born 14 February 1996) is an Argentine footballer who plays as a midfielder.

Career
López began his career with Unión Sunchales. After making three appearances as they won promotion from Torneo Federal B in 2014, he made his bow in Torneo Federal A on 29 March 2015 during a draw with Vélez de San Ramón. In his second season, López scored his first senior goal against Defensores de Pronunciamiento. The 2016–17 campaign saw López score thirteen times, including braces over Defensores de Belgrano and Gimnasia y Tiro. Agropecuario, 2016–17 champions, signed López in July 2017, ahead of their season in Primera B Nacional. A twenty-three minute cameo against Atlético de Rafaela gave López his pro debut.

López joined Guillermo Brown on 30 June 2018. He featured in three fixtures before leaving midway through the campaign to rejoin Unión Sunchales in January 2019. He departed in June 2020.

Career statistics
.

References

External links

1996 births
Living people
People from Castellanos Department
Argentine footballers
Association football midfielders
Torneo Argentino B players
Torneo Federal A players
Primera Nacional players
Unión de Sunchales footballers
Club Agropecuario Argentino players
Guillermo Brown footballers
Club Sportivo Ben Hur players
Sportivo Las Parejas footballers
Sportspeople from Santa Fe Province